The pāōā (often written as paoa, as the Tahitian is not punctilious about writing accents), is a modern dance from Tahiti where the dancers sit on their knees in a circle on the ground, sing and tap with their hands on their thighs on the rhythm of the music, which is a quite repetitive scanning refrain. Selected members, one boy and one girl, dance inside the circle. The whole scenario has something of a rooster fight (not common on Tahiti). Coincidentally the theme of the dance is usually from the hunt or from fishing.

References

Further reading
Patrick O'Reilly; La danse à Tahiti

Dances of Tahiti